The strangle knot is a simple binding knot. Similar to the constrictor knot, it also features an overhand knot under a riding turn. A visible difference is that the ends emerge at the outside edges, rather than between the turns as for a constrictor. This knot is a rearranged double overhand knot and makes up each half of the double fisherman's knot.

See also
List of binding knots
List of knots
Clove hitch in comparison
Transom knot

References